The Carolina Sandhills salamander (Eurycea arenicola), is a species of lungless salamander endemic to the state of North Carolina in the United States, where it is only found in the Sandhills region. These species are known for their coloration and ecology. Researchers decades ago separated the species into northern and southern groups and found that the southern and northern Sandhill salamanders differ in coloration, size, and natural history.

Taxonomy 
It is a member of the "two-lined salamander" complex, a species complex also containing several other Eurycea species including E. bisineata, E. cirrigera, and E. wilderae. It is most closely related to E. cirrigera but can be distinguished from it by the dark-spotted, orange-to-red coloration of mature individuals, in contrast to the much more yellowish E. cirrigera. Carolina Sandhill salamanders have shorter bodies, tail, and heads compared to their close relative, E. cirrigera.

Discovery  
The species was discovered in 1969 by Alvin Braswell, a curator of the North Carolina Museum of Natural Sciences, who collected the first known specimen. It was initially thought to be an unusual southern two-lined salamander (E. cirrigera), but further discoveries of similar specimens indicated a distinct population of salamanders, potentially representing an undescribed species. Attempts were made by Braswell in the 1980s to describe the species, but he cut his research short after he found his duties as assistant curator to be too burdensome. He turned his research over to his successor, Bryan Stuart, in 2008; Stuart continued Braswell's project starting in 2013 after technological advances allowed for further DNA sequencing; the species was finally described in 2020.

Distribution 
It is found in the Carolina Sandhills. It inhabits the longleaf pine ecosystem, where it lives in springs and blackwater rivers, as with other endangered amphibians restricted to this ecosystem such as the Pine Barrens tree frog (Dryophytes andersonii). Although all known records are from North Carolina, one specimen was found only 2 miles from the border with South Carolina, so it may be present there as well.

Threats 
Its population has declined due to general habitat alteration and loss.

References

Eurycea
Endemic fauna of North Carolina
Amphibians described in 2020
Amphibians of the United States